The YM-III or YM-3 is a circular ABS plastic cased Iranian minimum metal anti-tank blast mine. It is a copy of the Chinese Type 72 non-metallic anti-tank mine. The mine uses a blast-resistant fuze, which relies on the gradual application of pressure to trigger it. The mine is found in Afghanistan, Bosnia, Iran, and Iraq.

Specifications
 Diameter: 270 mm
 Height: 110 mm
 Weight: 7 kg
 Explosive content: 5.7 kg of Composition B
 Operating pressure: 450 to 900 kg

References

 Jane's Mines and Mine Clearance 2005-2006

Anti-tank mines